Curahuasi District is one of the nine districts of the Abancay Province in Peru.

Geography 
Other mountains are listed below:

Ethnic groups 
The people in the district are mainly indigenous citizens of Quechua descent, although with a sizable percentage of mestizo and castizo population located mainly in the urban center.

Quechua is the language which the majority of the population (73.79%) learnt to speak in childhood, 25.86% of the residents started speaking using the Spanish language (2007 Peru Census).

See also 
 Apurímac River

References

Districts of the Abancay Province
Districts of the Apurímac Region